Club Deportivo Tenerife "C" is the second reserve team of CD Tenerife. It is based in Santa Cruz de Tenerife, in the autonomous community of the Canary Islands, and currently plays in Interinsular Preferente – Group 3, holding home games at Centro Insular de Atletismo de Tenerife, with a 3,000-seat capacity.

History
Founded in 2005 as a transition team between the Juvenil and the reserve squads, Tenerife C only played in the Primera Regional until its disbandment in 2011.

In May 2017, Tenerife C was again included in the club's organization charts. Starting back at the Segunda Interinsular, the lowest category of the regional competitions, the club achieved two consecutive promotions as champions.

In the 2019–20 season, the first back at the fifth division, Tenerife C won their group of the league, but was unable to promote to Tercera División as CD Tenerife B was in that category.

Season to season

References

External links
Official website 
Futbolme team profile 

Football clubs in the Canary Islands
Sport in Tenerife
Association football clubs established in 2005
CD Tenerife
Spanish reserve football teams
2005 establishments in Spain